Carlos M. Quintela (born 1984) is a Cuban filmmaker and screenwriter.

Career 
Quintela was born in Havana, Cuba. He studied mass media at the Instituto Superior de Arte and screenwriting at the Escuela Internacional de Cine y Televisión in San Antonio de los Baños.

His debut feature La piscina (The Swimming Pool) premiered at the Berlinale and was screened at more than 20 film festivals. His second feature film, La obra del siglo (The Project of the Century), was also screened internationally, such as the Miami International Film Festival and the International Film Festival Rotterdam, where it won the prestigious Tiger Award.

Partial filmography

As director 

 2006: Cuidad sobre ruedas
 2007: Stand By
 2008: Contenedores
 2011: La piscina (The Swimming Pool)
 2015: La obra del siglo (The Project of the Century)
 2022: The Russian Playground

External links

References 

1984 births
Living people
Cuban film directors
Cuban screenwriters